Bart Cassiman (born 1961), freelance-curator, art critic and editor, is an art historian and studied press- and communication sciences at the Ghent University (1979-1984).

Early career 

He was the project-leader of the exhibition Initatief 86 which took place in the St. Pieters Abbey and the Museum of Contemporary Art of Ghent in 1986. 
This was an exhibition on Belgian art for which Kasper König, Jan Hoet, Jean-Hubert Martin and Gosse Oosterhof made the selection. The exhibition included a.o. works by Chantal Akerman, Guillaume Bijl, Jacques Charlier, Luc Deleu, Lili Dujourie, Jef Geys, René Heyvaert, Raoul De Keyser, Marie-Jo Lafontaine, Panamarenko, Guy Rombouts, Walter Swennen, Narcisse Tordoir, Jan Vercruysse and Didier Vermeiren,...

From September 1986 until the end of 1988, Bart Cassiman was curator for Contemporary Art at the Palais des Beaux-Arts (BOZAR) in Brussels where he organized (in collaboration with the director Jan Debbaut) several exhibitions of contemporary art (Didier Vermeiren, Narcisse Tordoir, Art & Language, Jan Vercruysse, Luciano Fabro, Per Kirkeby...)

Curatorial practice 

As a free-lance curator he organized several exhibitions between 1989 and 1991. Amongst others:

 Rombouts and Tordoir, Douglas Hyde Gallery, Dublin, 1989.
 Noli me tangere - with Lili Dujourie and Cristina Iglesias, Locus Solus - Genova, Italy, 1990.
 De Pictura - an exhibition on motive and alibi in the painting of Herbert Brandl, Helmut Dorner, John Murphy, Mitja Tušek, Narcisse Tordoir and Walter Swennen - Bruges La Morte, Bruges, 1990.
 The solo-exhibitions of Lili Dujourie, Kunstverein, Bonn, 1989; Le Magasin, Grenoble, 1990.

Espacio Mental with René Daniëls, Thierry De Cordier, Isa Genzken, Cristina Iglesias, Thomas Schütte and Jan Vercruysse at Valencia, IVAM-El Carme in 1991 was his first major group show. The exhibition contained about 80 artworks, was complex and layered so that the different interrelations between the artworks became almost endless.

Bart Cassiman was the project-leader of the section Contemporary Visual Art of Antwerp 93, European Capital of Culture. For this temporary organization he realized three major projects which differed in terms of intent and content.

For the Middelheim Museum he invited ten artists (Per Kirkeby, Richard Deacon, Panamarenko, Thomas Schütte, Juan Muñoz, Matt Mullican, Bernd Lohaus, Harald Klingelhöller, Didier Vermeiren, Isa Genzken) to make a work, which was bought by Antwerp 93 for the permanent collection. They were placed on Middelheim Low, which became by doing so the section of contemporary art of the museum. A section invented by Cassiman and realized with the support of Bob Cools (The Mayor), Eric Antonis (the intendant of Antwerp 93) and Hans Nieuwdorp (the director of the Art Historical Museums of the City of Antwerp). This project became known as New Sculptures.

For the first time, the Royal Museum of Fine Arts hosted contemporary artists who gave form to entwining of remembrance and imagination in the creative process. This project (exhibition and book), The Sublime Void (on the memory of the imagination),  included the artists Jean-Marc Bustamante, Jan Vercruysse, Rachel Whiteread, Juan Muñoz, Niek Kemps, John Murphy, Mitja Tušek, Gerhard Richter, Michelangelo Pistoletto, Luc Tuymans, Robert Gober, Cristina Iglesias, Harald Klingelhöller, Didier Vermeiren, Thomas Schütte, Ettore Spalletti, Luciano Fabro, Jeff Wall, Jannis Kounellis, René Daniels, Franz West, Fortuyn/O’Brien, James Welling, Lili Dujourie and Thierry De Cordier. The accompanying publication contains texts, essays, poems etc. by a.o. Adorno, Augustinus, Baudelaire, Benjamin, Blanchot, Borges, Broch, Canetti, Handke, Hölderlin, Kafka, Kristeva, Musil, Michelangelo, Nietzsche, Pascal, Proust, Rilke, Valery, Wenders, Wordsworth...It has been rewarded with the Gouden penning van Plantijn-Moretus, an award for the best book published in 1993.

For the third project, he invited after conscientiously research and several workshops three colleagues-curators (Iwona Blazwick, Yves Aupetitallot and Carolyn-Christov Bakargiev) to make an exhibition with artists from different cultural backgrounds to produce a new work in the extended M HKA. The for a long time underestimated exhibition On taking a normal situation and translating it into overlapping and multiple readings of conditions past and present which included at that time a few well-known artists (such as Jimmy Durham, Mark Dion, Eugenio Dittborn, Judith Barry and Renée Green) in combination with a lot of artists who were at the beginning of their public life and have since then co- determined the international discourse for years (Maria Eichhorn, Zarina Bhimji, Ann Veronica Janssens, Andrea Fraser,...)

From 1994 until 1998 he was member of the advisory-committee of the Middelheim Museum, Antwerp.

Bart Cassiman was part of the Jury of the Mies van der Rohe Stipendium Krefeld (1990-1995) and of the program-commission of the Appel Foundation, Amsterdam (1989-1993).

In 1995 he realized an exhibition with Dora Garcia, Dianne Hagen, Gert Verhoeven, Lisa May Post, Anne-Marie Schneider and Stephen Wilks, at Galerie Nelson, Paris. In the same year he co-ordinated the project Arte Habitable with Alicia Framis. He wrote the essay for the catalogue which he edited too.

In 1997 Bart Cassiman curated the exhibition and edited the publication Green Easter (with Dianne Hagen, Carla Klein, Aglaia Konrad, Peter Rogiers, Stephen Wilks and Robert Suermondt) at the Museum Dhondt-Dhaenens, Deurle. He wrote a substantial essay on the work of Lili Dujourie and edited the catalogue and curated the show at Lisson Gallery, London.

At the Rijksakademie in Amsterdam he curated the Open Studio’s 1997. This project included more than 50 young artists, such as Carlos Amorales, Emmanuelle Antille, Lise Baggesen, Maura Biava, Franck Bragigand, Jeroen Eisinga, Meshac Gaba, Winneke Gartz, Mark Hosking, Runa Islam, Saskia Janssen, Moshekwa Langa, Fang Lijun, Els Opsomer, Ebru Özseçen, Anne Van der Plas, De Rijke/De Rooij, Emmanuel Ropers, Dierk Schmidt, Tim Stoner, Tomoko Take, Fiona Tan, Hermann Terrier, Claire Todd, Vera Weisgerber, Edwin Zwakman,...

At the end of 1997 he organized also two exhibitions with the Belgian painter Jan Van Imschoot. In Hasselt (Provinciaal Museum) he curated his first painting overview. In Amsterdam (Artbook) he curated an exhibition on drawings.

In 1998 he organized his - until today - last exhibition: Privacy: Tuymans – Balka for Serralves, Porto.

In 2000 he was responsible for the Flemish selection for the Milano Europa 2000 project. The selected artists were: Marie José Burki, Jan Van Imschoot and Gert Verhoeven.

Art critic 
Bart Cassiman is also active as a freelance art-critic, having written essays for catalogues on a.o. René Daniëls, Raoul De Keyser, Harald Klingelhöller, Lili Dujourie, Cristina Iglesias, Jan Vercruysse, Thierry De Cordier, Paul Robbrecht, Walter Swennen, Narcisse Tordoir, Juan Muñoz, Thomas Schütte, Isa Genzken, Alica Framis, Robert Suermondt, Aglaia Konrad, Carla Klein,... and several articles for national and international newspapers and art-magazines (De Standaard, De Morgen, Knack (magazine), Kunst & Museumjournaal, Meta, Artefactum, Kunst Nu, Metropolis M and Flash Art), about art policy and specific subjects related to art.

In 1989 he edited the first small monography De architectuur en het beeld (The Architecture and the Image) on the work of the architects Paul Robbrecht / Hilde Daem. In 1995 he did the same on the work of Thierry De Cordier with a text of Stefan Hertmans.

In 1996/1997 he is a member of the staff of editors of DWB (Dietsche Warande en Belfort), an important magazine on literature. For this he edited in collaboration with Peter Verhelst a special number (DWB 6/97) on Juan Muñoz.

Teaching 
On the level of education, Bart Cassiman has been, besides for almost a decade (1989 – 1998) tutor at the Rijksakademie, Amsterdam, a guest-lecturer at the Appel Foundation in Amsterdam and Le Magasin in Grenoble (for the curator training which is organized by those institutes), at Sotheby's London (educational studies for future artworld-professionals) and at P.A.R.T.S., the institute for dance founded by Anne Teresa De Keersmaeker of Rosas.

Since 1985 he participated at many lectures, symposiums and workshops on the subject of contemporary art, organised by different museums, art institutions and galleries. Amongst others in Geneva he participated at the symposium  (25-26 February 1989, Centre d’art contemporain) and in Stuttgart at A new spirit in curating (25-26 January 1992, Künstlerhaus). He was a member of the studygroup which prepared the symposium Writing about art (1991, Van Abbe Museum, Eindhoven). At the occasion of the publication Art, gallery, exhibition. The gallery as a vehicle for art, edited by gallery Andriesse and De Balie, Amsterdam, he took part in the symposiums organized in Amsterdam (7 September 1996), Rotterdam (8 September 1996) and Antwerp (8 October 1996). In Brussels (25-26 October 1996) he participated at the colloquium Art et commande publics, organized by Encore Bruxelles.

The Absent Museum 

From 1989 until 2000 he was responsible for the BACOB bank collection of contemporary art. The collection contained at the end about 180 works of around 40 different international artists, a.o. Stan Douglas, Franz West, Herbert Brandl, Lili Dujourie, Cristina Iglesias, Thomas Schütte, Harald Klingelhöller, Allan McCollum, Narcisse Tordoir, Helmut Dorner, Luc Tuymans, Jan Fabre, Bazilebustamante, Jean-Marc Bustamante, Thierry De Cordier, James Welling, Juan Muñoz, Jan Vercruysse, Mitja Tušek, Gert Verhoeven, Stephen Wilks, Dianne Hagen, Jan Van Imschoot, Robert Suermondt, Carla Klein, Niek Kemps, Alicia Framis, Isa Genzken, Ebru Özseçen, Gregor Schneider, Valerie Mannaerts, Bjarne Melgaard, Mike Kelley, Carlos Amorales, Miroslav Balka.

Due to a severe illness Bart Cassiman was forced to stop all his professional activities at the end of the nineties. Without any doubt one can say that he was one of the most active and energized persons of the artworld between the mid-eighties and the end of the nineties. With colleagues such as Saskia Bos, Ulrich Loock, Julian Heynen, Dennis Zacharopoulos and a few others he was responsible  for the visualization of a generation by making exhibitions and writing texts and convincing many museums and collectors to buy their works.

The bank for which he collected more than a decade bought as a result of his engagement and advise the well-known Vanderborght building in the heart of Brussels, at the end of the nineties. Everything was prepared to open the first private (corporate) museum on this scale in Western Europe. The opening was planned for the spring of 2002. But because the engine of this whole operation fell silent the project died a quiet dead. Big parts of the collection were sold and so stays the capital of Europe deprived of an urgently needed Museum of Contemporary Art...

References

Further reading

Primary sources
 Cassiman, Bart; Martin, Jean-Hubert; König, Kasper; Oosterhof, Gosse; Hoet, Jan. Initiatief 1986. Gent: Imschoot (1986).
 Cassiman, Bart. "The pictorial diversity of a generation". 6 Young Flemish Artists. Dirk De Bruycker, Walter Swennen, Philippe Tonnard, Narcisse Tordoir, Hans Vandekerckhove, Philippe Vandenberg. Washington: Art Society of The International Monetary Fund (1986).
 Cassiman, Bart. "«Farbzustände» von Raoul De Keyser". Guillaume Bijl, Jan Vercruysse, Lili Dujourie, Raoul De Keyser. Bern: Kunsthalle Bern (1986).
 Cassiman, Bart. "Einigie (möglische) Überlegungen zum Niederschlag von René Daniëls' amüsiertem Umgang mit der Wirklichkeit in Wort und Bild". Daniëls. Bern: Kunsthalle Bern (1987).
 Cassiman, Bart. "L'Oeuvre au Noir". Flash Art. N°146 May / June 1989.
 Cassiman, Bart. Paul Robbrecht Hilde Daem. De architectuur en het beeld. Antwerpen: deSingel (1989).
 Cassiman, Bart. Lili Dujourie. Grenoble: Centre national d'art contemorain (1989).
 Cassiman, Bart. Harald Klingelhöller. Eindhoven: Stedelijk Van Abbemuseum; London: The Whitechapel Art Gallery (1990).
 Cassiman, Bart. "Alzumeazume or La Musee Amusée". Kunst & Museumjournaal. N° 5 1990. 
 Cassiman, Bart. "Images and their effects: Imagination in the plural" Walter Swennen. Heerlen: Stadsgalerij (1990).
 Cassiman, Bart. Cristina Iglesias. Amsterdam: De Appel (1990).
 Cassiman, Bart. "Propos sur le maître de schoorisse" L'Art en Belgique. Flandre et Wallonie au XXe Siècle. Un point de vue. Paris: Musée d'Art Moderne de la Ville de Paris (1991).
 Cassiman, Bart. Espacio mental. Valencia: Generalitat Valenciana (1991).
 Cassiman, Bart. "Het relaas van een wanhoop: over de meester van Schoorisse. Thierry De Cordier" Kunst & Museumjournaal. N°5 (1992).
 Cassiman, Bart. Nieuwe beelden : Openluchtmuseum voor Beeldhouwkunst Middelheim. Antwerpen: Antwerpen (1993).
 Cassiman, Bart; Ramael, Greet; Vande Veire, Frank. The sublime void : on the memory of the imagination. Ghent: Ludion (1993).
 Cassiman, Bart. On taking a normal situation ... Antwerpen: Antwerpen 1993 v.z.w. / Museum van Hedendaagse Kunst, Antwerpen (1993).
 Cassiman, Bart "Necessary but not urgent" Pose. N°9 Spring / Summer 1993. 
 Cassiman, Bart. "Lili Dujourie" Kunst in België na 1980. Brussel: Koninklijke Musea voor Schone Kunsten van België (1993).
 Cassiman, Bart. "Jan Vercruysse" Kunst in België na 1980. Brussel: Koninklijke Musea voor Schone Kunsten van België (1993).
 Cassiman, Bart. " Arte Habitable. Amsterdam (1995).
 Hertmans, Stefan. Eenzaamheid op de marktplaats. Over het werk van Thierry De Cordier. Brussel: Hayen (1995).
 Cassiman, Bart (a.o.) "Middelheim, 1995+..." De WItte Raaf. N°58, November–December 1995.
 Cassiman, Bart. "Par amour de l'art" De Morgen. 1 December 1995.
 Cassiman, Bart. Green Easter. Museum Dhondt-Dhaenens Deurle: Museum Dhondt-Dhaenens (1997).
 Dujourie, Lili; Cassiman, Bart. Lili Dujourie. London: Lisson Gallery (1997).
 Cassiman, Bart . "Juan Muñoz". Dietsche Warande & Belfort. N°6 December 1997.
 Cassiman, Bart. "The same again, but different" L&B (Lier en Boog). Series of Philosophy of Art and Art Theory. Volume 13 (1998).
 Ramos, Maria. Privacy : Luc Tuymans/Miroslaw Balka. Porto, Portugal: Fundação de Serralves (1998).
 Cassiman, Bart. "Adieu Chantal" Knack Focus. 10 October 2015.

Secondary sources

Early Years 
 Waterschoot, Hector. "Een hete, artistieke zomer. Gentse musea en galerijen brengen een monsterprojekt : Initiatief 86" Knack. 18 June 1986.
 Van Den Abeele, Lieven. "Initiatief 86. Alleen visitekaartje van Belgische kunst" De Standaard. 27 June 1986.
 Gillemon, Danièle. "L'art contemporain à Gand: une abondance d'expositions pour vous édifier ou vous achever !" Le Soir. 25 July 1986.
 Meuris, Jacques. "«Initiatief 86» : Gand au carrefour de l'art contemporain" La Libre Belgique. 11 July 1986.
 De Baere, Bart. "Het is geen diktaat over Belgische Kunst" Special Knack Magazine. (1986).
De Zutter, "Initiatief '86 of hoe een mug een olifant baarde" De Morgen. 21 June 1986.

Curatorial Practice 
 

 Borka, Max "Lili Dujourie in het Bonner Kunstverein. Fluweel en schone schijn. Verdwaalde rekwisieten op zoek naar een auteur." De Morgen. 28 December 1989.
 Favet, Catherine. "Lili Dujourie" Art Press. October 1990.
 Bost, Bernadette. "Velours et marbres de Lili Dujourie" Le Monde. 11 July 1990.
 Braet, Jan. "Moord in de galerie" Knack. 18 July 1990.
 De Cecco, Emanuela. "Lily Dujourie, Cristina Iglesias. Locus Solus" Flash Art. April / May (1991).
 Borka, Max. "'Espacio Mental' in Valencia. De nazaten van de Heilige Hiëronymus" De Morgen. 31 May 1991.
 Penxten, Stéphane. "L'imagination au pouvoir" La Libre Belgique. 12 June 1991.
 Cortés, José Miguel G. "Los estratos de la mente. Seis artistas europeos en Valencia" El Pais. 1 June 1991.
 Jarque, Vicente. "Moradas del arte. El Centre del Carme acoge una muestra colectiva bajo el título de Espacio mental" Cultura. June 1991.
 Middendorp, Jan. "Ver van de dolle menigte" Knack. 26 June 1991.
 Lambrecht, Luk. "Mental Space" Forum International. N° 10, November 1991.
 Entrop, Pieter. "Bart Cassiman" Metropolis M. N° 4 1991. 
 Braet, Jan. "Antwerpen '93. Het ideale museum" Knack. 10 March 1993.
 Van Den Bergh, Jos. "Bart Cassiman on his show "The Sublime Void"" Forum International. N°18 May / August 1993.
 Gillemon, Danieèle. "Le Deuxième Souffle du Middelheim" Le Soir. 9 June 1993.
 Braet, Jan. "Antwerpen '93. Als op een zomernacht. Nieuwe Beelden voor Middelheim" Knack. N°24 1993.
 Lubbers, Frank. "Nieuwe Beelden" Metropolis M. N° 4 1993.
 Van Mulders, Wim "Nieuwe beelden voor het Middelheim" Muziek & Woord. June 1993.
 Turine, Roger Pierre. "Le Middelheim contemporain" La Libre Belgique. 11 June 1993.
 McFadden, Sarah. "Sculpture garden sprouting new works. The Middelheim museum enjoys a breath of fresh air" The Bulletin. 24 June 1993.
 S.N. "Kirkebys store skulptur/hus" Politiken Sǿndag. 18 July 1993.
 Van der Geer, Cees. "Herwaardering van een beeldenpark" Haagse Courant. 19 July 1993.
 Montón, Carmen. "Amberes y Lisboa planean ceder parte de la capitalidad cultural europea a Sarajevo" La Vanguardia. 25 July 1993.
 Bracke, Eric. "Hedendaagse kunst in Antwerpen: 'Het sublieme gemis'. Met andere woorden" De Morgen. 30 July 1993.
 Chauvy, Laurence. "Expositions à Anvers. L'imagination et sa mémoire / La surprise est dans le parc" Journal de Genève et Gazette de Lausanne. 31 July 1993.
 Braet, Jan. "Antwerpen '93. De Lege Ruimte" Knack. 4 August 1993.
 Borka, Max. "Letter from Antwerp" The Bulletin. 5 August 1993.
 Depondt, Paul. "Dingen waarvan de tijd nog niet is aangebroken" De Volkskrant. 6 August 1993.
 Romare, Kristian. "Skulptur for skulpturer" Information. 6 August 1993.
 Von Radziewsky, Elke. "Der geliehene Sinn" Die Zeit. 6 August 1993. 
 Van der Geer, Cees. "Kunstwerken als toekomstige dingen" Haagse Courant. 18 August 1993.
 Braet, Jan. "In de maag van geest" Knack. 18 August 1993.
 Braudeau, Michel. "L'Anvers de l'art" Le Monde. 21 August 1993.
 Muller, Robert-Jan. "Tien nieuwe beelden in Middelheim" Archis. September 1993. 
 Marcelis, Bernard. "Le Manque Sublime" Art e Culture. September 1993.
 Puvogel, Renate. "The Sublime Void" Kunstforum. September 1993. 
 Barten, Walter. "Doorbroken concepten. Twee boeiende exposities in culturele hoofdstad Antwerpen93" Het Financieele Dagblad. 4 September 1993.
 Vonck, Bart. "Hun tijd is nog niet aangebroken. Tentoonstelling 'Het Sublieme Gemis'" Markant. N°35 10 September 1993.
 Lebovici, Elisabeth "L'Anvers du décor" Libération. 18 September 1993.
 Bouman, Ole. "Talent voor de ultieme leegte" De Groene Amsterdammer. 22 September 1993.
 Braet, Jan. "Tegen de nieuwe schoolmeesters" Knack. (1993).
 Lambrecht, Luk. "Over een drieluik" Antwerpen 93. (1993). 
 Ruyters, Marc. "Afsluiting van drieluik in het MUHKA. Ook beeldende kunst weet het antwoord niet" Financieel Economische Tijd. 25 September 1993.
 Wilson, Andrew. "Antwerp 93" Art Monthly. November 1993.
 Lambrecht, Luk. "Antwerp 93" Flash Art. November / December 1993.
 Bracke, Eric. "De versnipperde archipel" De Morgen. 14 February 1997.
 Borka, Max. "Groene Pasen bloemleest kunst uit schemerzones" De Standaard. 15 February 1997.
 Braet, Jan. "Eros en Narcis in hun eerste bloei" Knack. 26 February 1997.
 Barten, Walter. "Eigenzinnig en consequent" Het Financieele Dagblad. 3 March 1997.
 Lorent, Claude. "Le printemps de l'art actuel" La Libre Belgique. 10 March 1997.
 Pontzen, Rutger. "Groene Pasen" Metropolis M. N°2 1997.
 Borka, Max. "Onder lakens van lood. Lili Dujourie in de Londense Lisson Gallery" DS MAGAZINE. 13 June 1997.
 Van Hove, Jan. "Broedplaats voor jonge kunst. Rijksacademie Amsterdam houdt open ateliers" De Standaard. 1997.
 Roos, Robbert. "Rijksakademie open voor jacht op het nieuwste talent" Trouw. 28 November 1997. 
 Ruyters, Marc. "De onacademische aanpak van de Rijksacademie" De Financieel-Economische Tijd. 29 November 1997.

Art Critic 
 Van Synghel, Koen. "Museum voor Krappe Kunsten. Het Koninklijk Museum voor Schone Kunsten in Antwerpen op zoek naar ruimte in eigen huis" DS MAGAZINE. 8 December 1995.
 Ruyters, Marc. "Tegen '92 zou Brussel zowat de Kunsthalle van Europa moeten zijn. Interview met Bart Cassiman" De Morgen. 28 September 1988.
 Braet, Jan. "Kunst om te stelen" Knack. 17 September 1997.

The Absent Museum 
 Pitteljon, Honoré (ed.). Artesia Center for the Arts. Bruxelles: Artesia Banking Corporation (1999). 
 Mast, Michel (ed.) Bacob & Art. Bruxelles: Bacob & Art (1996).

External links

1961 births
Living people
Belgian art curators
Belgian art critics
Ghent University alumni
Belgian art historians
Date of birth missing (living people)